The General Nathan Cooper Mansion is a historic house in Chester Township, Morris County, New Jersey and was the home of Nathan A. Cooper (1802–1879). It was added to the National Register of Historic Places on November 21, 1976 for its significance in architecture and military/political history.

See also
National Register of Historic Places listings in Morris County, New Jersey
Nathan Cooper Gristmill

References

		
National Register of Historic Places in Morris County, New Jersey
New Jersey Register of Historic Places
Victorian architecture in New Jersey
Houses completed in 1860
1860 establishments in New Jersey
Chester Township, New Jersey